The Angeles Tunnel is a ,  water tunnel located in the Sierra Pelona Mountains in Los Angeles County, California, about  north of Los Angeles. It was constructed between 1967 and 1970 as part of the California State Water Project and serves as the final leg of the west branch of the California Aqueduct, which carries Northern California water to Southern California residents.

The tunnel also supplies water to the adjacent Castaic Power Plant, a pumped-storage hydroelectricity generation facility. To facilitate power generation, the tunnel's flow is bidirectional. The water is then stored in the Elderberry Forebay, adjacent to Castaic Lake. During off-peak hours, water is pumped uphill through the tunnel in the opposite direction from Elderberry Forebay and returned to Pyramid Lake. This operation reduces the energy cost of moving water along the California Aqueduct.

See also
 California State Water Project
 California Aqueduct

Notes

References
 
 
 
 
 
 
 
 

Water tunnels in the United States
California State Water Project
Water in California
Tunnels in Los Angeles County, California